Albert Thellung (12 May 1881 – 26 June 1928) was a Swiss botanist.

He was a professor at the University of Zürich. The Austrian botanist Otto Stapf named the plant genus Thellungia of the grass family, Poaceae, after him, and Otto Eugen Schulz named the genus Thellungiella (family Brassicaceae) in his honor.

Thellung made contributions to the third (1909–14) and fourth (1923) editions of Schinz and Keller's Flora der Schweiz.

Works
Illustrierte Flora von Mittel-Europa 1906
Die Gattung Lepidium (L.) R. Br. : eine monographische Studie 1906
La flore adventice de Montpellier 1912 
Flora der Schweiz - Kritische Flora, 1914	
Flora der Schweiz - Exkursionsflora, 1923	
Die Entstehung der Kulturpflanzen 1930

References

External links
 

1881 births
1928 deaths
Scientists from Zürich
20th-century Swiss botanists